The Mercedes-Benz W188 was a two-door luxury sports tourer produced by Mercedes-Benz between 1951 and 1958. The company's most expensive and exclusive automobiles, the elegant, hand-built 300 S (1951-1954) and its successor 300 Sc (1955-1958) were the pinnacle of the Mercedes line of their era.

The pair's conservative styling belied their technological advances, sharing numerous design innovations and mechanical components with the iconic Mercedes-Benz 300 SL "Gullwing", including engine, suspension, and chassis.

From July 1952 to August 1955, a total of 216 Coupés, 203 Cabriolet As, and 141 Roadsters were produced.

300 S
The hand-built two-door 300 S (W188) was Mercedes-Benz's top-end vehicle on its introduction at the Paris Salon in October 1951. It was available as a 2-seat roadster, 2+2 coupé, and cabriolet (with landau bars, officially Cabriolet A). Although mechanically similar to the much larger contemporary four-door 300 (W186), the additional craftsmanship, visual elegance, and 50% higher price tag elevated the W188 to the apex of its era's luxury cars.

The 300 S was fitted with a high-performance version of the W186's 3.0 L (2996 cc/182 in³) overhead cam, aluminum head M186 straight-6, the M188. Designed to give reliable service under prolonged hard use, the engine featured deep water jackets, an innovative diagonal head-to-block joint that allowed for oversized intake and exhaust valves, thermostatically controlled oil cooling, copper-lead bearings, and a hardened crankshaft.

300 Sc

The 300 Sc (W188) appeared in 1955, featuring upgrades to both its engine and suspension. Following the high-performance 300SL Gullwing's lead a year earlier, the Sc's inline-six received a version of its mechanical direct fuel-injection, which delivered a significantly detuned  at 5400 rpm. Mercedes-Benz's "low-pivot" independent suspension was fitted in the rear. Only a pair of chrome strips on either side of the hood visually distinguished it from its precursor.

Prices rose to DM 36,500, and 98 Coupés, 49 Cabriolet As, and 53 Roadsters were built through April 1958.

References

Notes

Bibliography

External links 
 
 
 

W188